Piskun (Ukrainian or Belarusian: Піскун; Russian: Пискун) is a gender-neutral Slavic surname that may refer to the following notable people:
 Elena Piskun (born 1978), Belarusian former artistic gymnast
 Eduard Piskun (born 1967), Ukrainian football player
 Jerzy Piskun (1938–2018), Polish basketball player
 Svyatoslav Piskun (born 1959), Ukrainian lawyer and politician

See also
 

Belarusian-language surnames
Ukrainian-language surnames